James Kenneth Hyde (1915-2010) was a male English international table tennis player.

Table tennis career
He won two bronze medals at the 1939 World Table Tennis Championships in the men's doubles with Hyman Lurie and in the Swaythling Cup (men's team event) with Ernest Bubley, Hyman Lurie, Ken Stanley and Arthur Wilmott.

He represented England 16 times between 1933 and 1939. He played for the Liverpool club, was ranked English number one in 1937 and was the only Englishman to beat Viktor Barna.

He reached the final of the English Open doubles in 1934 when partnering with Andrew Millar.

Personal life
He studied at the University of Liverpool and earned a BSc in chemistry. His brothers Gilbert Cecil Hyde and Eric Hyde both played county table tennis. He married in 1940 and was in the Royal Air Force. He died in 2010.

See also
 List of England players at the World Team Table Tennis Championships
 List of World Table Tennis Championships medalists

References

1915 births
2010 deaths
English male table tennis players
Alumni of the University of Liverpool
Sportspeople from St Helens, Merseyside
World Table Tennis Championships medalists
Royal Air Force personnel of World War II